Showco was a sound equipment provider of touring sound reinforcement equipment and services to the concert touring industry. It was based in Dallas, Texas, United States. In 2000, Showco was acquired by Clair Global.

Showco was established in 1970 by Jack Maxson and Rusty Brutsche, and Jack Calmes, and is known for helping to pioneer post Woodstock-era stadium rock shows by providing state-of-the-art sound equipment for famous acts beginning with Led Zeppelin, Three Dog Night and James Taylor. According to Brutsche:

With Showco equipment and services, the star performers could count on reliable and consistent sound reproduction at different venues. Showco introduced such features as mixing gear and stage monitors to aid the musicians. The equipment was also built to handle rugged touring schedules, outdoor weather conditions and quick assembly and disassembly.

Later forays into stage lighting led to the 1981 formation of sister company Vari-Lite, Inc.

The list of artists that Showco has provided equipment for is extensive, including Jesus Christ Superstar; Mountain; Blood, Sweat & Tears; Lee Michaels, Grand Funk Railroad; the Osmonds; Rare Earth; Cat Stevens; David Cassidy; Little Feat; The Band; Wishbone Ash; Genesis; Eric Clapton; Leon Russell; Linda Ronstadt; Carole King; Jackson Browne; The Kinks; Commodores; Guess Who; Nazareth; The Average White Band; Black Oak Arkansas; Thin Lizzy; Golden Earring; Robert Palmer; The Moody Blues; Yoko Ono; REO Speedwagon; Ted Nugent; Uriah Heep; Willie Nelson; the Beach Boys; Lynyrd Skynyrd; Bad Company; Freddie King; Alice Cooper; Van Halen; Peter Gabriel; ZZ Top; Bee Gees; Wings; Paul McCartney; The Rolling Stones; David Bowie; The Who; Prince; Julian Lennon; Bob Seger; Diana Ross; Janet Jackson; Reba McEntire; Vince Gill; Alan Jackson; Clint Black; George Michael; INXS; Phil Collins; Mick Jagger; Boston; Santana; Bon Jovi; Guns N' Roses; Britney Spears; 'N Sync; Ozzy Osbourne & Ozzfest; Korn; Limp Bizkit.

Acquisition by Clair Brothers in 2000
Showco was acquired by Clair Brothers in late 2000.  Showco was merged into the touring arm of Clair Brothers.  The combined division was then renamed ClairShowco.  In 2008 the name was changed once again to Clair and given the corporate tagline "Global Service and Live Shows Since 1966."

References

External links
 Clair Brothers, Showco website
 Former Showco (1970–2008) staff website
 The Showco PA provided for The Who's 1975–1976 tour
Rusty Brutsche Interview – NAMM Oral History Library (2016)

1970 establishments in Texas
American companies established in 1970
Technology companies established in 1970
Technology companies disestablished in 2000
Companies based in Dallas
Privately held companies of the United States
Defunct technology companies of the United States
Sound technology
Sound systems
Defunct companies based in Texas